Marzocca is an Italian surname. Notable people with the surname include:

Gioia Marzocca (born 1979), Italian fencer
Marco Marzocca (born 1962), Italian actor and comedian

Italian-language surnames